Synanceiini commonly known as stonefishes, is a tribe of venomous ray-finned fishes classified within the subfamily Synanceiinae, the stonefishes, part of the family Scorpaenidae, the scorpionfishes and their relatives. These fishes are found in the Indo-Pacific.

Genera
Synanceiini contains the following genera:

 Dampierosa Whitley, 1932
 Erosa Swainson, 1839
 Leptosynanceia Bleeker, 1874
 Pseudosynanceia Day, 1875
 Synanceia Bloch & Schneider, 1801
 Trachicephalus Swainson, 1839

References

Synanceiinae
 
 Taxa named by Johann Jakob Kaup
Fish tribes